Vladimirsky (masculine), Vladimirskaya (feminine), or Vladimirskoye (neuter) is the name of several rural localities (settlements, selos, villages, and stanitsas) in Russia:
Vladimirsky, Oryol Oblast, a settlement in Druzhensky Selsoviet of Dmitrovsky District of Oryol Oblast
Vladimirsky, Penza Oblast, a settlement in Lopatinsky Selsoviet of Lopatinsky District of Penza Oblast
Vladimirsky, Saratov Oblast, a settlement in Rovensky District of Saratov Oblast
Vladimirskoye, Mari El Republic, a selo in Krasnovolzhsky Rural Okrug of Gornomariysky District of the Mari El Republic
Vladimirskoye, Nizhny Novgorod Oblast, a selo in Vladimirsky Selsoviet of Voskresensky District of Nizhny Novgorod Oblast
Vladimirskoye, Smolensk Oblast, a village in Pechatnikovskoye Rural Settlement of Kholm-Zhirkovsky District of Smolensk Oblast
Vladimirskoye, Tula Oblast, a selo in Samarskaya Volost of Kurkinsky District of Tula Oblast
Vladimirskaya, Krasnodar Krai, a stanitsa in Vladimirsky Rural Okrug of Labinsky District of Krasnodar Krai
Vladimirskaya, Leningrad Oblast, a settlement of the crossing in Susaninskoye Settlement Municipal Formation of Gatchinsky District of Leningrad Oblast
Vladimirskaya, Smolensk Oblast, a village in Divasovskoye Rural Settlement of Smolensky District of Smolensk Oblast

See also
Vladimirsky Lager, a rural locality in Pskov Oblast